The third HMS Halcyon was a  of the Royal Navy. Once described as "perhaps the smallest and least formidable vessel that ever crept into the 'Navy List'", she was launched in 1894 and was put up for sale before World War I.  She was recommissioned in 1913, was converted to a minesweeper and served under the orders of the Admiral Commanding Coast Guard and Reserves. She was sold for breaking in 1919.

Design
Ordered under the Naval Defence Act of 1889, which established the "Two-Power Standard", the class was contemporary with the first torpedo boat destroyers. Halcyon was engined by Hawthorn Leslie and Company with two sets of vertical triple-expansion steam engines, two locomotive-type boilers, and twin screws. Halcyon produced , nearly twice the power of the rest of her class. She carried between 100 and 160 tons of coal and was manned by 120 sailors and officers.

Armament
The armament when built comprised two QF  guns, four 6-pounder guns and a single 5-barrelled Nordenfelt machine gun.  Her primary weapon was five 18-inch (450 mm) torpedo tubes, with two reloads. On conversion to a minesweeper in 1914 two of the five torpedoes were removed.

Construction
Halcyon was laid down at Devonport Dockyard on 2 January 1893 and launched on 6 April 1894.

Operational history

Naval review of 1897
On 26 June 1897 Halcyon was present at the Fleet Review at Spithead in celebration of Queen Victoria's Diamond Jubilee.

Mediterranean station
HMS Halcyon was commissioned to serve at the Mediterranean Station by Commander Scott W. A. Hamilton Gray in March 1898. She was stationed at Souda Bay in early March 1900, but later the same month left for Port Said to temporary relieve  as coast defence ship. In May 1901 she left the Mediterranean and paid off at Devonport, to be placed in the Fleet Reserve for refitting.

Pre-war service
Although being offered for sale, she was recommissioned at Sheerness on 5 July 1913.

World War I service
In August 1914 she became the ship of the Senior Naval Officer North Sea Fisheries, serving under the orders of the Admiral Commanding Coast Guard and Reserves. Located at Yarmouth, she was involved in the Raid on Yarmouth.

On 29 July 1917, Halcyon spotted a periscope near the Smiths Knoll buoy east of Yarmouth, and carried out a ramming attack, followed by dropping two depth charges. Halcyon was credited with sinking the submarine, .

Disposal
She was sold to J H Lee of Dover for breaking on 6 November 1919.

Notes

References

Bibliography

 
 
 
 

 

Dryad-class torpedo gunboats
Ships built in Plymouth, Devon
1894 ships
Victorian-era gunboats of the United Kingdom
World War I minesweepers of the United Kingdom